Riad Jarjour is a Syrian Christian clergyman who has served as General Secretary of the Middle East Council of Churches between 1994 and 2003. Born in Aleppo and grew up in the city of Homs.

Biography
While in high school, he spent one year in Green Bay, Wisconsin, as an exchange student. He completed his B.A. degree at Hagazian College and M.Div. at the Near East School of Theology, both in Beirut, Lebanon, and in 1978 was ordained a Minister in the Evangelical Synod of Syria and Lebanon.

Further studies include the STM degree in Islamic studies from the Near East School of Theology, and the D.Min. degree at McCormick Theological Seminary, Chicago, Ill. A chaplain in South Lebanon for several years, he joined the Middle East Council of Churches in 1978 as Director of the Youth Program, and in 1983 became co-director, with his wife, Roseangela, of the Ayia Napa Conference Center in Ayia Napa, Cyprus.

In 1985 he was named Associate General Secretary of the MECC and Director of its Unit on Education and Renewal. The MECC has become increasingly involved in Christian-Muslim dialogue under the Rev. Jarjour's leadership.

Jarjour presently is the general secretary of the Arab Group For Muslim-Christian Dialogue.

Legacy
During his nine-year tenure with the MECC, Jarjour has brought the council's program closer to the grass roots of the churches, rationalized its structure. He managed to maintain the council's effective ministries despite the shrinking financial resources. He also worked to strengthen the ministry of the council among its member churches and especially in the Holy land. He supported the cause of the Palestinian people, and advocated for the preservation of the Arab identity of Jerusalem.

He has organized and led several events like the Muslim-Christian conference on Jerusalem (Beirut, June 14–17, 1996) and several other substantial events over the following years. Over the years, the council's role as the venue for communication between middle eastern Christians and Muslims was greatly enhanced. Rev. Jarjour was among the key contributors to and editors of the landmark document of the Arab Working Group for Christian Muslim Dialogue, “Dialogue and Coexistence: An Arab Muslim-Christian Covenant” (finalized in Cairo in December 2001).

Jarjour was instrumental in planning and administering an important meeting between the heads of the Middle East's churches (The Council of Nicosia). Under his administration the council's relief work in Iraq continued to be effective and timely. The council was also on the ground to respond to the earthquakes in Iran and Turkey. He administered the program on Justice, Peace and Human Rights which evolved into an effective instrument for analysis, training and promoting vital concerns not only of Christians but of all groups in middle eastern society.

Jarjour's led the Arab Group for Christian Muslim Dialogue on activities in the region and internationally, which culminated in an important document on Christian Muslim dialogue (The Christian Muslim covenant). He also developed the activities of the world association for Christian communication in the Middle East.

He is also a frequent speaker in international circles, on the ecclesiastical, religious, social and historical situation of the Middle East region.

External links
 Arab Group For Muslim-Christian Dialogue

Syrian Christians
People from Homs
Living people
Year of birth missing (living people)